Bernard Gehrmann may refer to:
 Bernard J. Gehrmann, U.S. Representative from Wisconsin
 Bernard E. Gehrmann, member of the Wisconsin State Assembly